Frère is a French surname. Notable people with the surname include:

Albert Frère (1926–2018), Belgian businessman
Aubert Frère (1881–1944), French general, founder of Organisation de résistance de l'armée
Bernard-Georges-François Frère (1764-1826), French general
Charles Edouard Frère (1837-1894), French painter, son of Pierre Edouard Frère
Charles-Théodore Frère (1814-1886), french painter
Édouard Frère (1797–1874), French bookseller, archivist, scholar and biographer
Gérald Frère (born 1951), Belgian businessman, son of Albert
Henry Bartle Frere (1815–1884), British diplomat
John Hookham Frere (1769–1846) British diplomat, politician and writer
Maurice Frère (died 1970), governor of the National Bank of Belgium
Paul Frère (1917–2008), Belgian racing driver and journalist
Pierre Edouard Frère (1819–1886), French painter, father of Charles Edouard Frère
Théodore Frère (1814–1888), French painter

See also

Frere

French-language surnames